Presland is a surname. Notable people with the surname include:

 Alicia Presland (born 1999), English cricketer
 Craig Presland (born 1960), New Zealand cricketer and business executive
 Eddie Presland (1943–2021), English footballer and cricketer
 Gary Presland, Australian archaeologist and writer